Louttit is a surname. Notable people with the surname include:

Darren Louttit (born 1965), Australian rules footballer
Henry I. Louttit, Sr. (1903–1984), American Episcopal bishop
Henry I. Louttit, Jr. (1938–2020), American Episcopal bishop
James A. Louttit (1848–1906), American politician
Jason Louttit, Canadian marathon runner
Stacie Louttit (born 1961), Canadian Paralympic sailor
Tom H. Louttit, American politician

Louttit may also refer to:
Louttit Laundry, a former laundry business in Rhode Island

See also
Loutit, a related surname